The following is a list of banks & financial institutions in Bahrain as of 30 June 2015:

Central Bank
Central Bank of Bahrain - CBB

Conventional banks

Islamic banks

See also
 List of banks in the Arab world

References

Banks of Bahrain
Bahrain
Banks
Bahrain